Lakewood Park is a private park located at the northern end of Lake Number Three in North Little Rock, Arkansas.  It is roughly bounded on the east by Edgemere Drive, the south by the lake, and the west by Lakeshore Drive, although a portion of the park lies west of Lakeshore Drive.  Use of most of the park's athletic and recreational facilities are limited to members of the Lakewood Property Owners Association, which owns and manages the park.  The park includes seven artworks by the Mexican artist Dionicio Rodriguez, which are listed on the National Register of Historic Places.

See also
National Register of Historic Places listings in Pulaski County, Arkansas

References

External links
Lakewood Property Owners Association web site

Historic districts on the National Register of Historic Places in Arkansas
Buildings and structures completed in 1933
Parks in Arkansas
North Little Rock, Arkansas
National Register of Historic Places in Pulaski County, Arkansas
Parks on the National Register of Historic Places in Arkansas